The Negro Ensemble Company (NEC) is a New York City-based theater company and workshop established in 1967 by playwright Douglas Turner Ward, producer-actor Robert Hooks, and theater manager Gerald S. Krone, with funding from the Ford Foundation. The company's focus on original works with themes based in the black experience with an international perspective created a canon of theatrical works and an audience for writers who came later, such as August Wilson, Suzan-Lori Parks, and others.

Beginnings
The Negro Ensemble Company was created in 1964 when Hooks created a tuition-free acting workshop for urban youth which he named the Group Theatre Workshop (GTW), in tribute to Harold Clurman's The Group Theatre. The group became a refuge for young minority actors, with a focus on black theatre. He and his associate Barbara Ann Teer produced in a one-night showcase for friends and family of the actors. The plays chosen were Gwendolyn Brooks's We Real Cool and Douglas Turner Ward's Happy Ending.

Jerry Tallmer, reviewer for the New York Post, happened to attend this showcase and gave it a glowing review. This inspired Hooks to produce Happy Ending and Ward's Day of Absence as a double bill presented by Robert Hooks Productions. After raising $35,000 from music executives Clarence Avant and Al Bell, Hooks booked the St. Mark's Playhouse (where many black performers had performed in the long-running show, The Blacks) and hired Gerald Krone as company manager.

Ward was invited by the New York Times to write an opinion piece for its Sunday edition on the state of black theatre. His piece, "American Theatre: For Whites Only?", published in August 1966, was a scathing indictment of America's theatre establishment and posited the need for a unique black theatre institution.

This article caused McNeil Lowery of the Ford Foundation contact Ward to set up a meeting with Ward, Hooks, and Krone. Invited to present a proposal, they came with a bid for an ensemble company much like Bertolt Brecht's Berliner Ensemble. The concept of a true ensemble company (a nucleus of actors performing a roster of plays back-to-back within each season) was uncommon in American theatre. A theatre based on the black experience, created and staffed by black artists, was even more of a departure. In the legacy of the Group Theatre Workshop, this new theatre incorporated a workshop providing tuition-free acting, directing, writing, and theatre administration instruction, which was intended to raise a new generation of theatre professionals. The proposal was accepted and they were awarded a three-year, $1.5 million grant to establish the company.

Controversy 
From the beginning, they resisted demands that the new company be located in Harlem and instead, sought out a space downtown where they could build on the existing theatre audience while cultivating an informed black theatre-going audience that hadn't previously existed on a significant scale. They chose the St. Mark's Playhouse primarily because of its flexible configuration.

During this era of Black Power, the decision to use the term, "Negro", rather than the more current, "Black", was controversial. The name was intended as a tribute to the Harlem Renaissance and the legacy of its artists (Langston Hughes, Zora Neal Hurston, Countee Cullen, Jessie Fauset, Claude McKay, Ethel Waters, etc.), some of whom were still alive and living in New York at the time. The term, "New Negro", made popular by philosopher and journalist Alain Locke, was used during the Harlem Renaissance to invoke an outspoken advocacy of dignity and a refusal to submit to the practices and laws of Jim Crow.

Krone, who was serving as administrative director for the company, was Caucasian, which caused some vocal protest from black nationalists.

To present
When introducing the Negro Ensemble Company, the three founders wanted to inform New York and the world that they were not "an exclusionary... but an inclusive... black theatre; an arts institution dedicated to discovering, nurturing and expanding a theatrical exploration of what it was to be black within in a 'world view' perspective." Part of this approach was to acknowledge that playwrights of many races, ethnicities, and nationalities had been, and currently, were writing about the experiences of Africans and African Americans, and about colonialism.

The first repertory season, 1967–1968, was not without controversy. The company presented Summer of the Seventeenth Doll by Australian playwright Ray Lawler; Kongi's Harvest by Nigerian playwright Wole Soyinka, Daddy Goodness by Richard Wright, and as their first play, Song of the Lusitanian Bogey by Swedish-German playwright Peter Weiss. The Weiss play addresses the oppression of black people from an international perspective, set in colonized Angola. Some black activists protested, accusing NEC of taking "white money" and for producing the work of a white playwright. On one occasion, activists attempted to storm the theatre during a performance of the Weiss play. Soon afterward, the NEC production of Song of the Lusitanian Bogey in London created further controversy, where the company was heckled by right-wing protesters who resented the play's anti-imperialist message.

Many of the plays produced by the Negro Ensemble Company dealt with complex, sometimes disturbing, and often ignored aspects of the black experience and the American experience. The company's nurturing of black playwrights (such as Lonne Elder III with Ceremonies in Dark Old Men and Charles Fuller with Zooman and The Sign) over four decades contributed to the body of plays and performance literature that form the backbone of the African-American theatrical canon.

While the company often received glowing reviews, had sold-out audiences, and was producing some of the critically acclaimed theatre of the era, the early 1970s found the Negro Ensemble Company in financial trouble. The 145-seat theatre had become too small to generate the revenue needed for its ambitious projects. During the 1972-73 season, the resident company was disbanded, staff was cut, workshops were cancelled, and salaries were deferred. The decision was made to produce only one new play per year.

The play chosen that year was The River Niger by Joseph A. Walker. A poetic play set in Harlem during the turbulent racial redefining of the 1970s, the work depicts the struggles of a proud black family divided between the past and the future. This was the first NEC production to transfer to Broadway, where it ran for nine months, won a Tony Award for Best Play, and embarked on a national tour. This helped to ensure the continued existence of the NEC.

In July 1980, the NEC relocated to a new 299-seat home at Theatre Four at 424 West 55th Street, where it would remain until 1991. In 1981, the NEC presented what would be its most successful production. A Soldier's Play by Charles Fuller is the story of the murder of a black soldier on a Southern army base during World War II, and the subsequent investigation by a black army captain. It examines black pride and black self-hatred, and won both the Pulitzer Prize and the New York Drama Critics Circle Best Play awards. The original cast included Adolph Caesar, Denzel Washington, Samuel L. Jackson, Brent Jennings, Steven Anthony Jones, Charles Brown, Larry Riley, Peter Friedman, Cotter Smith, James Pickens Jr., Eugene Lee, and Stephen Zettler. In 1984, it was made into a movie, featuring several original cast members and NEC alumni (notably Adolph Caesar, Denzel Washington, and David Alan Grier). The film of A Soldier's Story was nominated for three Academy Awards.

In 2005, the Negro Ensemble Company, Inc., a restructured incarnation of the original Negro Ensemble Company, was formed, with NEC alumna Charles Weldon as Artistic Director. It was among 406 New York City arts and social service institutions to receive part of a $20 million grant from the Carnegie Corporation, which was made possible through a donation by New York City Mayor Michael Bloomberg.

Major awards
Pulitzer Prize for Drama
 1982 – A Soldier’s Play

Tony Awards
 1969 – Special Achievement
 1973 – The River Niger

Obie Awards
 1968 – Citation for Excellence
 1971 – Dream on Monkey Mountain
 1973 – The River Niger
 1974 – The Great McDaddy
 1975 – The First Breeze of Summer
 1977 – Eden
 1979 – Nevis Mountain Dew
 1980 – Lagrima del Diablo
 1981 – Zooman and The Sign
 1981 – Sustained Achievement
 1982 – A Soldier’s Play

Vernon Rice Drama Desk Award
 1968 – Negro Ensemble Company
 1969 – Ceremonies in Dark Old Men
 1972 – Sty of the Blind Pig
 1973 – The River Niger

 Dramatists Guild Award
 1976 – The First Breeze of Summer
 1982 – A Soldier’s Play

New York Drama Critics’ Circle Award
 1982 – A Soldier’s Play

 American Theatre Wing Award
 1983 – Negro Ensemble Company

Clarence Derwent Awards
 1976 – The First Breeze of Summer
 1982 – A Soldier’s Play

Audelco Award
 1977 – Eden
 1980 – Home

Margo Jones Award
 1975 – The First Breeze of Summer

Outer Critics Circle Awards
 1980 – Home
 1982 – A Soldier’s Play

Eudora Welty Television Award
 1978 – The First Breeze of Summer

James A. Vaughn Award for Excellence in American Theatre
 1980 – Negro Ensemble Company

Premio Roma Award
 1969 – Song of the Lusitanian Bogey

Manhattan Theatre Club Award
 1982 – A Soldier’s Play

 Brandeis University Creative Award
 1970 – Negro Ensemble Company

New York State Arts Council Award
 1976 – Negro Ensemble Company

Bronze Medallion of New York City
 1977 – Negro Ensemble Company

New England Theatre Conference Special Award
 1981 – Negro Ensemble Company

Original company

 Norman Bush
 Rosalind Cash
 David Downing
 Frances Foster
 Arthur French
 Moses Gunn
 William Jay
 Judyann (Jonsson) Elder
 Denise Nicholas
 Esther Rolle
 Clarice Taylor
 Hattie Winston
 Allie Woods
 Production Stage Manager: Edmund Cambridge
 Stage Managers: Horacena J. Taylor, James S. Lucas, ‘Femi Sarah Heggie

Original staff

 Acting: Paul Mann, Lloyd Richards, Ron Mack, Luther James, Edmund Cambridge
 Directing: Michael A. Schultz
 Playwriting: Lonne Elder III, Steve Carter, Gus Edwards
 Set design: Edward Burbridge
 Costuming: Gertha Brock 
 Dance/choreography: Louis Johnson, Talley Beatty
 Vocal coach (for actors): Kristin Linklater
 Singing coach: Margaret Harris
 Theatre administration: Gerald S. Krone, Carolyn Jones, Fred Garrett

Notable alumni

David Ackroyd
Mary Alice
Debbie Allen 
John Amos
Ethel Ayler
Angela Bassett
Paul Benjamin
Earl Billings
Avery Brooks
Charles Brown
Graham Brown
Roscoe Lee Browne
Arthur Burghardt
Adolph Caesar
L. Scott Caldwell
Edmund Cambridge
Godfrey Cambridge
Rosalind Cash
Anthony Chisholm
Bill Cobbs	
Dwight Cook
Lawrence Cook
Keith David
Yaya DaCosta
David Downing
Bill Duke
O. L. Duke
Judyann Elder
Giancarlo Esposito
Antonio Fargas
Laurence Fishburne
Frances Foster
Al Freeman, Jr.
Arthur French
Richard Gant
Danny Glover
Carl Gordon
Louis Gossett Jr.
Robert Gossett
Elaine Graham
Layon Gray
David Alan Grier
Moses Gunn
Julius Harris
Jackée Harry
Sherman Hemsley
Kene Holliday
Kevin Hooks
Samuel L. Jackson
Steven Anthony Jones
Brent Jennings
Cleavon Little
Delroy Lindo
Marcella Lowery
Carol Lynn Maillard
Judi Ann Mason
James McDaniel
Hazel Medina
S. Epatha Merkerson 
Barbara Montgomery
Debbi Morgan
Garrett Morris
Denise Nicholas
Ron O'Neal
Roscoe Orman
James Pickens Jr.
Sheryl Lee Ralph
Phylicia Rashad
Latanya Richardson
Larry Riley
Roxie Roker
Esther Rolle
Richard Roundtree
Cotter Smith
Joyce Sylvester
Clarice Taylor
Glynn Turman
Sullivan Walker
Denzel Washington
Charles Weldon 
Lynn Whitfield
Samm-Art Williams
Dick Anthony Williams
Victor Willis
Hattie Winston
Malik Yoba
C. Kelly Wright

References

External links

1967 establishments in New York City
African-American theatre
Organizations established in 1967
Performing groups established in 1967
Special Tony Award recipients
Theatre Ensemble in New York City